is a Japanese former professional footballer who played as a centre back for J1 League side Tokyo Verdy and Yokohama F. Marinos. He was the formerly the captain of the Japan national team. His nickname is "Bomber" because of his distinctive hairstyle. Nakazawa is one of only seven Japanese players to reach 100 caps for his country.

Club career
Nakazawa started playing football for his home country. He played for Yoshikawa Higashi Junior High School and Misato Technology High School, but attracted no scouts' eyes. Determined to be a pro, he left for Brazil to improve his football skills and trained with América Mineiro. During his time there, he won the Campeonato Mineiro in the junior category and played a key role in coach Ricardo Drubscky's squad.

After a year, he returned to Japan and joined Verdy Kawasaki (later Tokyo Verdy) in 1998 as a trainee, which meant he received no compensation. He impressed the club enough to win a full professional contract the following year.

His first J1 League appearance came on 13 March 1999 against Cerezo Osaka at Todoroki Athletics Stadium. He scored his first league goal on 10 April 1999 against Nagoya Grampus Eight also at Todoroki. That year, he received the J.League Young Player of the Year award and was selected for the J.League Team of the Year.

He was transferred to Yokohama F. Marinos in 2002 and contributed to the club winning two consecutive J1 League championships in 2003 and 2004. He was selected as the Most Valuable Player of the league in 2004. He played more than 30 games every season from 2007 except 2010 season. He also played full time for 178 consecutive games from July 2013 to August 2018. This is a J.League record except goalkeeper. However he could not play at all in the match from August 2018 except last match in 2018 season.

On 8 January 2019, Yokohama F. Marinos announced his retirement at 2018 season. He was 40 years old.

International career
Philippe Troussier called him up for Japan national team. Nakazawa played in Olympic qualifiers as well as the finals in Sydney. Troussier promoted him to a full international. His first international appearance came on 8 September 1999 in a friendly against Iran at the International Stadium Yokohama. He scored his first goal on 13 February 2000 in an Asian Cup qualifier against Singapore in Macau.

He was a member of the Japan team who won the 2000 AFC Asian Cup in Lebanon. He played three games in the competition. However, he was not selected for the 2002 FIFA World Cup finals as Yutaka Akita was preferred.

Under new national manager Zico, he partnered with Tsuneyasu Miyamoto at the back line. He participated in the 2004 AFC Asian Cup finals. He played in all the Japan matches and scored three goals, one of which was a stoppage time equaliser in the semi-final against Bahrain, and Japan went on to win the title again.

He also played in the 2006 FIFA World Cup in Germany but the team failed to proceed to the knockout stage. After the tournament, he announced his retirement from the international football at the age of 28. However, six months later, he withdrew his decision and Ivica Osim played him in a friendly against Peru on 24 March 2007.

He played in the 2007 AFC Asian Cup finals but this time the team failed to defend the title and finished 4th in the tournament.

On 14 February 2010, Nakazawa made his 100th appearance for the Japan national team against South Korea in the final match of the 2010 East Asian Football Championship at Tokyo National Stadium. Nakazawa becomes only the third Japanese player, following Masami Ihara and Yoshikatsu Kawaguchi, to reach 100 caps for his country. Later that year, Yasuhito Endo also reached 100 caps for Japan.

On 30 May 2010, Nakazawa scored an own-goal in a friendly match against England to give England the lead; his defensive partner Marcus Tulio Tanaka had already scored an own goal to draw England level with Japan. The match ended 2–1 to England.

In the 2010 FIFA World Cup, Nakazawa played all four of Japan's games on their way to the round of 16 and knockout by penalties to Paraguay. He played some of the best football of his entire career and, alongside Marcus Tulio Tanaka, was the heart of defense.

Career statistics

Club

International

Scores and results list Japan's goal tally first, score column indicates score after each Nakazawa goal.

Honours
Yokohama F. Marinos
 J1 League: 2003, 2004
 Emperor's Cup: 2013

Japan
 AFC Asian Cup: 2000, 2004

Individual
 AFC Asian Cup Best Eleven – 2004
 J.League Most Valuable Player – 2004
 J.League Rookie of the Year – 1999
 J.League Best Eleven – 1999, 2003, 2004, 2005, 2008
 J.League 20th Anniversary Team
 Japanese Footballer of the Year – 2004
 Selected to AFC All Star Team – 1999
 East Asian Football Championship Best Defender – 2008

See also
List of footballers with 100 or more caps

References

External links

 
 
 Japan National Football Team Database
 
  

1978 births
Living people
Association football people from Saitama Prefecture
Japanese footballers
Japan international footballers
J1 League players
Tokyo Verdy players
Yokohama F. Marinos players
Japanese Footballer of the Year winners
J1 League Player of the Year winners
FIFA Century Club
AFC Asian Cup-winning players
2010 FIFA World Cup players
2007 AFC Asian Cup players
2006 FIFA World Cup players
2004 AFC Asian Cup players
2000 AFC Asian Cup players
Footballers at the 2000 Summer Olympics
Olympic footballers of Japan
Association football defenders